2015 migrant crisis may refer to:
2015 European migrant crisis, involving people from Africa and the Middle East migrating into Europe
2015 Rohingya refugee crisis, involving Rohingya people migrating from Myanmar and Bangladesh to other countries in Southeast Asia
Venezuela–Colombia migrant crisis, involving Colombian migrants being deported by Venezuela